was an intermediate-ranking Iga ninja during the Sengoku period.

In 1558, during the siege of Sawayama, Tateoka Doshun and his 48 men (including four Koga ninja) entered the Sawayama Castle by the use of bakemono-jutsu (ghost technique) of making paper lanterns displaying the enemy's badge. Dressed as a samurai and carrying the lanterns, they walked in unchallenged, then set fire to the castle, allowing Rokkaku Yoshikata to make a successful assault. The same technique was also used by Matsudaira clan during the siege of Kaminogō Castle in 1562. There is a popular rumour concerning the death of Tateoka Doshun that Tokugawa Ieyasu had Doshun assassinated by Hattori Hanzō during the Battle of Komaki and Nagakute for giving information to the Toyotomi clan.

References

Japanese ninjutsu practitioners
Ninja
People of Muromachi-period Japan
Samurai